Basil Guy may refer to:

 Basil John Douglas Guy (1882–1956), English recipient of the Victoria Cross
 Basil Guy (bishop) (1910–1975), English bishop